Akrep ("Scorpion") is a Turkish infantry mobility vehicle developed by Otokar Otobus Karoseri Sanayi AS. The first prototypes were completed in May 1993 and the first vehicles came off the production line in June 1994. In addition to light reconnaissance, the vehicles were used for escort, perimeter control, counterinsurgency, and light attack. The Akrep represented the latest offering in Otokar's portfolio of light vehicles for both civilian and military markets. Note that otokar comes from French  (autobus being another synonym more common in French and other languages, it may even be absent some languages using only bus or autobus) and designs busses that also can transport luggage (at the lower level). Passengers being at the higher level.

Description
The Akrep has an all-welded steel hull with some 70% of its automotive components used from the Land Rover Defender 90/110 (4x4) vehicle. A monocoque steel armor hull protects from small arms fire up to 7.62 mm ball ammunition fired at 90° incidence and point-blank range, and shell splinters. All windows and vision blocks are made of laminated construction armored glass with a polycarbonate liner. The layout is conventional, with the engine at the front, driver and commander in the center, and the machine gun installation mounted on the roof toward the rear with the gunner seated below. The windshield is bulletproof. There are two doors with bulletproof windows at the top and firing ports below. There are also firing ports and viewers on both sides of the hull and a large rear hull door with a firing port that swings out leftward. There is a hatch in the rear section of the roof that opens rearward. The roof gun mount is typically armed with a 7.62 mm machine gun that may be aimed and fired from inside the vehicle. Also there is AGS-17 mounted variants being used in Northern Cyprus.

The mount can traverse 180° left and right and the 7.62 mm machine gun can elevate from -20° to +70°. There are 230 rounds of ready-use ammunition, and an additional 3,000 rounds carried inside the vehicle. The firing is electronically controlled with safety locking and braking together with a mechanical backup. There is also a last round indicator. The day sight has a wide field of view (22°) with 1x magnification and a collimated aiming circle, and a narrow field of view (8°) with 8x magnification and a ballistic graticule. The night sight has a wide field of view (22°) with 1x magnification and collimated aiming circle, and a narrow field of view (7°) with 7x magnification, a 25 mm image intensifier tube, and a ballistic graticule.  Standard equipment includes an air conditioning system, a heater and defogger, an infrared driving headlamp, a blackout lighting system, a smoke extraction fan mounted on the roof, thick polyurethane roof and body interior lining for thermal and noise insulation, an explosion-suppressed fuel tank, and Hutchinson run-flat tires. Optional equipment includes a front-mounted electrical winch with 25 meters of cable at a capacity of 3,600 kg, 66 mm smoke grenade launchers, a pioneer kit (axe, shovel, pickaxe), a communications system, and a land navigation system.

The Akrep is relatively light, fast, and maneuverable.  Its high power/weight ratio and long travel suspension support mobility in urban conditions, rough terrain, and challenging weather.

Design and manufacture
The Akrep's low profile, ballistic hull design and special armor protection and agility are all designed to maximize its ability to survive in high-threat environments. Each armor plate is laboratory tested and certified. Each panel is stamped prior to production and fully traceable.

All mechanical parts of Akrep are made using commercial off-the-shelf components.

Operators

Current operators

Border Guards Bangladesh 

 used by RENEA

See also
Otokar Cobra
Otokar Akrep II

References

Armoured fighting vehicles of Turkey
Akrep
Military vehicles introduced in the 1990s